Go Tell It on the Mountain is a Grammy Award winning Christmas album by The Blind Boys of Alabama, released in 2003.

Track listing
"Last Month of the Year" – 3:03
"I Pray on Christmas" (featuring Solomon Burke) – 3:41
"Go Tell It on the Mountain" (featuring Tom Waits) – 3:57
"Little Drummer Boy" (featuring Michael Franti) – 3:19
"In the Bleak Midwinter" (featuring Chrissie Hynde & Richard Thompson) – 4:49
"Joy to the World" (featuring Aaron Neville) – 2:25
"Born in Bethlehem" (featuring Mavis Staples) – 6:36
"The Christmas Song" (featuring Shelby Lynne) – 2:34
"Away in a Manger" (featuring George Clinton & Robert Randolph) – 5:22
"Oh Come All Ye Faithful" (featuring Me'Shell Ndegeocello) – 2:10
"White Christmas" (featuring Les McCann) – 4:03
"Silent Night" – 3:19
"My Lord, What a Morning" – bonus track

Personnel
The Blind Boys of Alabama
Bobby Butler
Clarence Fountain
George Scott
Jimmy Carter
Joey Williams
Ricky McKinnie
Tracy Pierce
with:
Duke Robillard – guitar
Danny Thompson – double bass
John Medeski – Hammond B-3 organ
Michael Jerome – drums

Charts
2004 Top Gospel Albums No. 1
2004 Top Internet Albums No. 247

Awards
2004 Grammy Award for Best Traditional Soul Gospel Album

DVD
A DVD, Blind Boys of Alabama - Go Tell it on the Mountain : Live in New York, was recorded live in concert, in December 2003, at the Beacon Theatre in New York City. The special holiday concert aired on PBS in December 2004. The band performs with Aaron Neville, John Medeski, Duke Robillard, Chrissie Hynde, Mavis Staples, Michael Franti, Robert Randolph, and Charlie Musselwhite.

The Blind Boys of Alabama albums
Real World Records albums
2003 Christmas albums
Christmas albums by American artists
Covers albums
2004 live albums
2004 video albums
Live video albums
Gospel Christmas albums
Albums recorded at Capitol Studios